Wierzbno is a neighbourhood in Warsaw, a part of the Mokotów district. It was named in the 1930s after a village of the same name that had existed there since the 17th century.

Geography 
From the east it shares its border with the Mokotów housing estate of Sielce, from the south with Ksawerów, from the west with Wyględów, and from the north with Stary Mokotów (Old Mokotów).

According to the Municipal Information System, the area of Wierzbno is defined by Racławicka and Dolna Streets from the north, the Vistula escarpment from the east, Woronicza Street from the south and Wallachian Street from the west.

Infrastructure 
Until the 1960s Wierzbno was one of the southern suburbs of the city. After that it was urbanized with blocks of flats and a number of notable offices and facilities were located there, including the main offices of Polish Television and Polish Radio, as well as one of the tram yards.

There is a Warsaw Metro station of the same name located there (Wierzbno metro station).

References

External links
 

Neighbourhoods of Mokotów